The 2010 BOSS GP Series was the 16th season of the BOSS GP series. The championship began on 17 April at the Hockenheimring and ended on 3 October at Dijon-Prenois.

Teams and Drivers

Race results

Championship standings

Drivers Standings

References

External links
 

BOSS GP
2010 in formula racing
BOSS GP